41st & Fox station (sometimes stylized as 41st•Fox) is a commuter rail station in Denver, Colorado, United States. It serves the Regional Transportation District's B Line and G Line and serves the Globeville and Sunnyside neighborhoods. It is the first station northbound on the route from Denver Union Station.

The station was originally scheduled to open in 2016, but was delayed with the rest of the G Line to early 2019. It opened on April 26, 2019. 41st & Fox station has connections to TheRide buses.

References 

RTD commuter rail stations in Denver
Railway stations in the United States opened in 2019
2019 establishments in Colorado